The Gorgas Science Foundation is a nonprofit foundation based in South Texas established to support conservation and education.

The mission of Gorgas Science Foundation is to provide the highest quality educational opportunities, to foster greater awareness and understanding of ecological issues, and to encourage conservation of critical natural resources.

History

The foundation was started in 1947 and incorporated in 1983 by Texas Southmost College biology professor Barbara T. Warburton.  The name honors pioneering research scientist Dr. William Crawford Gorgas who served at Fort Brown in the 19th century.

Rio Grande Valley
In collaboration with the Audubon Society, the foundation operates the Sabal Palm Sanctuary in Brownsville, Texas.
In 1994 the Gorgas Foundation produced the 18 volume "Treasures of the Rio Grande Delta" documentary that focused on the history and habitat of the region.

In 2010 the foundation published the bilingual Spanish and English El Valle: The Rio Grande Delta an exploration of the biodiversity and culture of the region.

Hummingbirds
In 2016 the  foundation published Hummingbirds, by John C. Arvin. the first volume of the two volume set book on Hummingbirds.

International projects

Mexico
In cooperation with the University of Texas at Brownsville, the Gorgas Foundation has operated two biology field stations in the cloud forests along the eastern escarpment of northeastern Mexico’s Sierra Madre Oriental. The foundation's work at Rancho del Cielo and Rancho el Cielito research stations laid the groundwork for the creation of the 360,000 acre El Cielo Biosphere Reserve in Tamaulipas.

India
The Gorgas Foundation supported years of field work in the Western Ghats of India that culminated in a 60-minute documentary by prizewinning cinematographer Sandesh Kadur titled "Sahyadris – Mountains of the Monsoon."

See also
William C. Gorgas

References

External links
 

Scientific research foundations in the United States
Research institutes in Texas
Environmental organizations based in Texas